The 2019 Oracle Challenger Series – Indian Wells is a professional tennis tournament played on outdoor hard courts. It's the second edition of the tournament, which is part of the 2019 ATP Challenger Tour and the 2019 WTA 125K series. It took place from February 25 – March 3, 2019 in Indian Wells, United States.

Point distribution

Men's singles main-draw entrants

Seeds

 1 Rankings are as of 18 February 2019.

Other entrants
The following players received wildcards into the singles main draw:
  Jenson Brooksby
  Maxime Cressy
  Kyle Edmund
  Zane Khan
  Brandon Nakashima

The following player received entry into the singles main draw as an alternate:
  Thai-Son Kwiatkowski

The following players received entry from the qualifying draw:
  Ulises Blanch
  Michael Redlicki

The following player received entry as a lucky loser:
  Martin Redlicki

Women's singles main-draw entrants

Seeds

 1 Rankings are as of 18 February 2019.

Other entrants
The following players received wildcards into the singles main draw:
  Cori Gauff  
  Jamie Loeb  
  Caty McNally 
  Katie Volynets
  Wang Qiang

The following players received entry from the qualifying draw:
  Kayla Day 
  Ena Shibahara

Withdrawals
Before the tournament
  Paula Badosa Gibert → replaced by  Sesil Karatantcheva
  Polona Hercog → replaced by  Asia Muhammad
  Luksika Kumkhum → replaced by  Whitney Osuigwe
  Magda Linette → replaced by  Priscilla Hon
  Peng Shuai → replaced by  Francesca Di Lorenzo
  Arantxa Rus → replaced by  Kristie Ahn
  Magdaléna Rybáriková → replaced by  Han Xinyun
  Anna Karolína Schmiedlová → replaced by  Allie Kiick
  Samantha Stosur → replaced by  Claire Liu

Women's doubles main-draw entrants

Seeds 

 1 Rankings as of 18 February 2019

Other entrants 
The following pair received wildcard into the doubles main draw:
  Sanaz Marand /  Whitney Osuigwe

Champions

Men's singles

 Kyle Edmund def.  Andrey Rublev 6–3, 6–2.

Women's singles

 Viktorija Golubic def.  Jennifer Brady 3–6, 7–5, 6–3

Men's doubles

 JC Aragone /  Marcos Giron def.  Darian King /  Hunter Reese 6–4, 6–4.

Women's doubles

  Kristýna Plíšková /  Evgeniya Rodina def.  Taylor Townsend /  Yanina Wickmayer, 7–6(9–7), 6–4

References

External links 
 Official website

2019
2019 ATP Challenger Tour
2019 WTA 125K series
2019 in American tennis
2019 in sports in California
February 2019 sports events in the United States
March 2019 sports events in the United States